Tver State University is a university in the city of Tver and one of the largest universities in the Tver Oblast, of which Tver is the administrative center. It has been licensed to conduct activities in the field of vocational education since April 1, 1999. The university has a major research library with more than one million copies. There is active research work, conferences and seminars.

History
December 1, 1870 in Tver was opened a private school teacher P. Maksimovic 
In 1917 it was renamed in Tver Teachers Institute, and later - in Kalinin Pedagogical Institute. On September 1, 1971 it was reorganized into Kalinin State University. On February 18, 1972 in Kalinin Drama Theater saw the inauguration of Kalinin State University. In 1991 Kalinin State University was renamed in to its current name.

See also 
 :Category:Tver State University alumni

External links 

 Tver State University

 
Buildings and structures in Tver
Buildings and structures in Tver Oblast